Floreffe is a municipality of Wallonia located in the province of Namur, Belgium. 

On 1 January 2012 the municipality had 7,883 inhabitants. The total area is 38.89 km2, giving a population density of 203 inhabitants per km2.

The municipality consists of the following districts:  Floreffe, Floriffoux, Franière, and Soye. 

In 1977, the newly expanded (thus newly adjoining) municipality of Profondeville was given Lakisse, an area in the southeast of the original Floreffe.

Floreffe is best known as the location of Floreffe Abbey, founded in the 12th century and suppressed during the French Revolution.

Notable people
 

Joseph Hanse (1902–1992), Belgian linguist

Twin towns
 Prata di Pordenone, Italy

See also
 List of protected heritage sites in Floreffe

References

External links
 
Official website 

Municipalities of Namur (province)